Ayacucho is the capital city of Huamanga Province, Ayacucho Region, Peru

Ayacucho may also refer to:
Ayacucho, Buenos Aires, a city in Buenos Aires Province, Argentina
Ayacucho (crater), an impact crater on Mars
Ayacucho Parish, a parish in Guayaquil, Guayas, Ecuador
Ayacucho Partido, an administrative division of Buenos Aires Province, Argentina
Ayacucho Quechua, the Quechua dialect spoken in the Ayacucho Region of Peru
Ayacucho Region, an administrative division in Peru
Battle of Ayacucho, a decisive battle in the Peruvian War of Independence, 9 December 1824
Puerto Ayacucho, a city in Venezuela